Ait-Ouabane is a village in the Tizi Ouzou Province in Kabylie, Algeria.

Location
The village is surrounded by a forest in the Djurdjura mountain range.

References

Villages in Algeria
Kabylie